Gowd-e Kalur (also Romanized as Gowd-e Kalūr) is a village in Jangal Rural District, in the Central District of Fasa County, Fars Province, Iran. At the 2006 census, its population was 29, in 7 families.

References 

Populated places in Fasa County